Jim Hayes (February 18, 1948 – March 11, 2009) was a professional basketball shooting guard who spent one season in the American Basketball Association (ABA) as a member of the New York Nets (1970–71). Born in Ithaca, New York and raised in Rockville Centre, New York, he attended Boston University, where he was drafted by the Detroit Pistons during the third round of the 1970 NBA draft, but he never signed. After playing in the ABA, he went on to play professionally in France, where he had a long and successful career.

References

External links

1948 births
2009 deaths
American men's basketball players
Basketball players from New York (state)
Boston University Terriers men's basketball players
Detroit Pistons draft picks
New York Nets players
People from Rockville Centre, New York
Shooting guards
Sportspeople from Ithaca, New York